Zeng Chunlei (born 3 November 1989 in Beijing), is a Chinese volleyball player, who is a member of the Chinese women's national team that participated at the London Olympic Games. She currently plays for Chinese club Beijing.

Career
Zeng played at the 2013 Club World Championship with Guangdong Evergrande winning the bronze medal after defeating 3-1 to Voléro Zürich.

Zeng was the captain of the Chinese team that won the 2015 FIVB women's world cup in Japan.
She participated at the 2019 Montreux Volley Masters,

She signed for the Italian club Pomi Casalmaggiore for the 2017'18 season.

Clubs
  Beijing (2005–2013)
  Guangdong Evergrande (2013)
  Beijing (2013–2017)
  Pomi Casalmaggiore (2017)
  Beijing (2017–2018)
  Shanghai (2018) (loaned)
  Beijing (2018–2020)

Awards

Clubs
 2019/2020 Chinese League - Bronze medal, with Beijing BAIC Motor
 
 2017/18 Chinese League - Runner-up with, Shangai
 2013 Club World Championship -  Bronze medal, with Guangdong Evergrande

References

Chinese women's volleyball players
Living people
1989 births
Olympic volleyball players of China
Volleyball players at the 2012 Summer Olympics
Volleyball players from Beijing
Opposite hitters
Outside hitters
Chinese expatriates in Italy
Chinese expatriate sportspeople
Expatriate volleyball players in Italy
Asian Games gold medalists for China
Asian Games medalists in volleyball
Medalists at the 2018 Asian Games
Volleyball players at the 2018 Asian Games
21st-century Chinese women